New York Sun Works, founded in 2004 by Ted Caplow, is a non-profit organization that uses hydroponic farming technology to educate students and teachers about the science of sustainability. To further this goal, NY Sun Works created the Greenhouse Project, an initiative dedicated to improving K through 12 grade environmental science education through the lens of urban agriculture, empowering children to make educated choices about their impact on the environment. The Greenhouse Project was inspired by NY Sun Works’ first project, the renowned Science Barge; a prototype, sustainable urban farm and environmental education center previously housed on the Hudson River and now located in Yonkers under different ownership.

Partnerships 

As of August 2019, NY Sun Works has 129 partner schools with completed Greenhouse Classrooms.

NY Sun Works partner schools with completed greenhouse classrooms in Manhattan, Brooklyn, Bronx, Queens, Staten Island, and New Jersey include :

  †  lab no longer in use
NY Sun Works have partnered with Brooklyn Borough President Eric Adams who announced a $2 million investment in 12 NYSW labs in underserved Brooklyn Communities for fiscal year 2016.

NY Sun Works is also a committed Clinton Global Initiative (CGI) America Commitment to Action partner for the Grow A Lot project which will build greenhouses on vacant lots in areas needing greater access to fresh food. A model for future projects, the first greenhouse will be built in East New York, Brooklyn and incorporate NY Sun Works’ classroom layout and "Discovering Sustainability Science" curriculum, enabling hands-on STEM learning for area schools and community members.

The nonprofit Students for Service has partnered with Bedford Stuyvesant New Beginnings Charter School and NY Sun Works to teach nutrition and distribute food grown in the Greenhouse Classroom to students and neighborhood families.

The Harvard Business School Club of New York recently partnered with NY Sun Works under HBSCNY’s Community Partners program. Assisting with an assessment of potential NY Sun Works partnerships, the team of Community Partners volunteers prepared a set of key recommendations on growth alternatives.

The Greenhouse Project 

The Greenhouse Project was created in 2008 to increase K – 8th grade students’ interest and proficiency in STEM education while understanding the environmental issues of their time: global climate change, efficient use of water and energy, building greener cities, and growing a secure and healthy food supply. The Greenhouse Project initiative uses urban agriculture technology to provide an ideal hands-on learning facility paired with a project-based, integrated curriculum.

A greenhouse project classroom can be built as a traditional greenhouse or in a converted classroom to accommodate a hydroponic urban farm and environmental science laboratory. Grade school children grow food while engaging in hands-on learning about nutrition, water resource management, efficient land use, climate change, biodiversity, conservation, contamination, pollution, waste management, and sustainable development. To facilitate this hands-on learning environment, the Greenhouse Project classroom typically includes Nutrient film technique hydroponic growing systems, Dutch-Bucket systems, Vertical Integrated Growing systems, an aquaponics or fish farm tank, a Rainwater harvesting system, a vermi-composting corner, and a weather station.

The 2016 NY Sun Works Curriculum and Science Achievement Report conducted by Kate Gardner Burt, PhD, RD (Teachers College, Columbia University) concluded that students who receive the NY Sun Works curriculum are more likely to score higher on the 4th grade science achievement test than students who do not receive the NY Sun Works curriculum

Achievements 

	Partnered with Brooklyn Borough President Eric Adams to bring 21st century science and sustainability education into the classroom. 
School lab funded by participatory budgeting debuts. 
New York Sun Works wins the HBSCNY Gold Community Partners Leadership Award.  
26 greenhouse classrooms are fully operational, and 24 more labs are in development.
	 Created a comprehensive K – 12th grade sustainable STEM curriculum designed for integration with the Greenhouse Classrooms.
	 Designed and operated the Science Barge, a classroom and showcase for sustainable hydroponic agriculture which had over 20,000 unique visitors. Now owned and operated by Groundwork Hudson Valley, the Science Barge is still an active teaching tool.
	 Conducted 13 DOE-approved After School Professional Development Program courses on "Water, Energy, and Waste: Integrating Themes of Sustainability into your Classroom," training over 100 teachers.
	 Hosted 4th annual Discovering Sustainability Science Youth Conference, which featured 5th - 8th grade students from NY Sun Works partner schools presenting on a range of topics within the themes of "Building Sustainable Cities," "Building a Sustainable Future," and "Building Sustainable Minds."
	 Featured in several media outlets including
 CBS News,
 PBS Newshour,
 PBS Metro News, Aljazeera America, CNN,
 NY1 News
 ABC 7 News,
 The New York Times,
 NY Daily News,
 Change Observer,
 The Economist,
 Edible Magazine,
 TIME Magazine for Kids,

References

External links 
 Official Website
 NYSW Youth Conference Official Website

Non-profit organizations based in New York (state)
Environmental organizations based in New York (state)
Environmental organizations based in New York City